The Queen's Gambit is a chess opening.

Queen's Gambit may also refer to:

Novel
 The Queen's Gambit (novel), 1983, by Walter Tevis, later developed into the 2020 Netflix miniseries

Television
 The Queen's Gambit (miniseries), a 2020 Netflix adaptation of the Walter Tevis novel

Episodes
 "Queen's Gambit" (Assignment Vienna)
 "Queen's Gambit" (Boon)
 "Queen's Gambit" (Captain Harlock and the Queen of a Thousand Years)
 "Queen's Gambit" (Falcon Crest)
 "Queen's Gambit" (Holby City) 
 "Queen's Gambit" (Hotel)
 "Queen's Gambit" (The New Adventures of He-Man)
 "Queen's Gambit" (Terminator: The Sarah Connor Chronicles)

Other uses
 The Queen's Gambit (Arrowverse), a yacht in the superhero franchise
 Queen's Gambit, a 2016 Indian short film by Sayantan Ghosal